The Leitrim county football team represents Leitrim in men's Gaelic football and is governed by Leitrim GAA, the county board of the Gaelic Athletic Association. The team competes in the three major annual inter-county competitions; the All-Ireland Senior Football Championship, the Connacht Senior Football Championship, and the National Football League.

The team last won the Connacht Senior Championship in 1994 but has never won the All-Ireland Senior Championship or the National League.

Considered "Connacht's traditional minnows", Leitrim is never considered seriously as likely to win a major title.

Leitrim's home ground is Páirc Seán Mac Diarmada, Carrick-on-Shannon. As of 2022, the team's manager is former Ballaghaderreen and full-forward Mayo county player, Andy Moran.

History
Leitrim's football history has brought sparse reward. They first competed in the All-Ireland in the 1907 championship. They were beaten by Roscommon on a score of 0-03 to 0-01 in the Connacht semi-final in their first ever match. The county won its first ever match in the 1910 championship, beating Sligo in the Connacht quarter-final by 0-03 to 0-00. They were then beaten by Galway in the semi-final.

Leitrim did not record another win until the 1914 championship. They beat Sligo by 5-07 0-02 to qualify for their first ever Connacht final but were beaten by Roscommon in the decider. In the semi-final of the 1924 Connacht Championship, Leitrim forced Mayo to a draw, then refused to play extra-time. Galway went on to be beaten in the final by Mayo following a replay. In 1927, with training from Sean O'Hehir, father of the veteran radio commentator Micheál and with the help of good fortune when Connacht semi-finalists Roscommon had to line out without five players whose car had broken down, Leitrim won their first ever Connacht title. Leitrim won the Connacht title and held Kerry to two points in the semi-final of the All-Ireland Senior Football Championship.

In the days of Cathal Flynn, Colin McNulty and Packie McGarty, both Connacht Railway Cup players, Leitrim lost four successive Connacht finals to Galway between 1957 and 1960, coming closest in 1958 when they equalised midway through the second half but were defeated by two points (Cathal Flynn scored 1-6). Flynn retired in 1966 from inter-county football while McGarty was at the end of his career when Leitrim were heavily beaten by a score 4-15 to 0-7 against Mayo in the Connacht final in 1967, scoring only one point from play. Leitrim won the National Football League Division 2 title and contested the 1959 NFL semi-final with a changed fullback line but were beaten by Derry by seven points. A new generation of Leitrim under-21 players hosted and nearly beat the great Kerry team at Carrick-on-Shannon in 1977 before losing by five points, 3-13 to 3-8. The expected breakthrough from Michael Martin and his men never happened.

John O'Mahony was appointed Leitrim manager to build on the success of the Under-21 team that won the 1991 Connacht Championship. He took Leitrim to the final of the 1994 Connacht Championship. Leitrim did not have an easy route to the final, beating Roscommon by a point and only overcoming Galway by a point in a replay. They took on Mayo in the final, overcoming O'Mahony's native county by two points in Hyde Park. O'Mahony's feat in leading the team that is traditionally the weakest in the province to that title is still heralded nationally to this day. Leitrim were ultimately beaten in the All-Ireland semi-final by Dublin at Croke Park. Since losing to Sligo in 1989, Leitrim had suffered a series of near-misses, and might have followed up 1994 against Galway, losing by a single point in 1995 and two points in 1996. The first county to benefit under the parentage rule was also the first to lose their big catch, with the loss of Declan Darcy to Dublin depleting the panel in 1998, bringing Leitrim's most successful era to an end.

Leitrim sprung a massive shock when they won the FBD Insurance League in 2013, defeating their southern neighbours Sligo in the final. This was the county's fourth ever trophy and their first since 1994. As the Irish Independent reported, "There may have been no danger of any cows going unmilked in Leitrim after this game, but winning their first FBD League title – and their first trophy in 19 years – sparked off some understandable early season celebrations for Connacht's traditional minnows". They retained the title in 2014, defeating Roscommon in the final.

The county's Vocational Schools team have made it to two All-Ireland Vocational Schools Championship Finals losing to Carlow in 1972 and Donegal in 1995.

Current panel

INJ Player has had an injury which has affected recent involvement with the county team.
RET Player has since retired from the county team.
WD Player has since withdrawn from the county team due to a non-injury issue.

Current management team
Manager: Andy Moran
Assistant manager: Mike Solan
Selector: James Glancy, until end of 2022 season
Head physiotherapist: Eanna Madden (international sprinter), replacing Shane Bohan ahead of the 2023 season

Managerial history
Leitrim have a history of appointing "foreign" managers, with John O'Mahony, from Mayo, proving to be the most successful; O'Mahony led Leitrim to the 1994 Connacht SFC (a first in 67 years). Other outsiders to manage Leitrim include Seamus Bonner, from Donegal; Peter McGinnity, from Fermanagh; Declan McCabe, from Monaghan, P. J. Carroll, from Cavan; Declan Rowley, from Longford, Dessie Dolan, from Westmeath; Mickey Moran, from Derry.

Players

Notable players

Records
 Cathal Flynn: Ireland player 1960, 1961
 Packy McGarty: Ireland player 1957, 1958

All Stars
Leitrim has 2 All Stars.

1990: Mickey Quinn
1994: Seamus Quinn

Honours

National
All-Ireland Senior B Football Championship
 Winners (1): 1990
Tommy Murphy Cup
 Runners-up (1): 2006

All-Ireland Minor Football Championship
 Runners-up (2): 1945, 1956

Provincial
Connacht Senior Football Championship
 Winners (2): 1927, 1994
 Runners-up (9): 1914, 1949, 1957, 1958, 1959, 1960, 1963, 1967, 2000
Connacht FBD League
 Winners (2): 2013, 2014
Connacht Junior Football Championship
 Winners (7): 1938, 1941, 1946, 1952, 1962, 2004, 2017
Connacht Under-21 Football Championship
 Winners (2): 1977, 1991
Connacht Minor Football Championship
 Winners (3): 1945, 1956, 1998
Connacht Minor Football League
 Winners (1): 1983

References

 
County football teams